Simon Graham Arkell (born 1 July 1966) is an Olympic pole vaulter from Australia, who competed in two consecutive Summer Olympics, starting in 1992. During his career he was Commonwealth Champion, NCAA All-American (5 times), WAC Conference Champion (7 times) and broke 9 Australian and 4 Commonwealth records. He was also Australian (3) and British (2) Champion, was 1993 Australian Athlete of the Year and is in the Athletics Hall of Fame for the State of South Australia and the University of New Mexico, USA. After his athletic career Arkell went on to co-found Versifi Technologies, Predixion Software and Deep Lens, an oncology-focused clinical trial matching software company that uses artificial intelligence to match cancer patient to clinical trials. Deep Lens is backed by venture capital firms Northpond Ventures, Sierra Ventures, Rev1 and Tamarind Hill Fund. He is also a seed stage investor and sits on the boards of Uneeq and LBT Innovations.

Achievements

References

1966 births
Living people
Australian male pole vaulters
Athletes (track and field) at the 1986 Commonwealth Games
Athletes (track and field) at the 1990 Commonwealth Games
Athletes (track and field) at the 1992 Summer Olympics
Athletes (track and field) at the 1996 Summer Olympics
Olympic athletes of Australia
Commonwealth Games medallists in athletics
Commonwealth Games gold medallists for Australia
20th-century Australian people
Medallists at the 1990 Commonwealth Games